Erigeron vernus is a North American species of flowering plant in the family Asteraceae known by the common name early white-top fleabane. It is native to the southeastern United States from Virginia to Louisiana.

Erigeron vernus grows in moist locations in flatwoods and savannahs, and sometimes in ditches and by roadsides. It is a biennial or perennial herb up to 50 centimeters (20 inches) tall, producing rhizomes and a woody underground caudex. The inflorescence is made up of 1–25 flower heads in flat-topped arrays. Each head contains 25–40 white ray florets surrounding numerous yellow disc florets.

References

vernus
Flora of the Southeastern United States
Plants described in 1753
Taxa named by Carl Linnaeus
Flora without expected TNC conservation status